William FitzMaurice may refer to:

William FitzMaurice (Irish politician) (1671–1711), Irish MP for Dingle
William FitzMaurice, 20th Baron Kerry (1633–1697), Irish peer
William FitzMaurice, 2nd Earl of Kerry (1694–1747), Irish peer
William FitzMaurice, 1st Lord of Naas (D.C.1199)
William Petty FitzMaurice (1737–1805), British Prime Minister from (1782–1783), born William Fitzmaurice
William FitzMaurice (MP) (1805–1889), British politician